Henry Thomas "Red" Hadley (March 28, 1909 – November 1, 1974) was an American Negro league outfielder in the 1930s.

A native of Thomasville, Georgia, Hadley played college football for Morris Brown College, where he once returned a punt 75 yards for a touchdown. Hadley made his Negro leagues debut in 1937 with the Atlanta Black Crackers, and played for three seasons with the club, which became known as the "Indianapolis ABCs" in 1939. He died in Atlanta, Georgia in 1974 at age 65.

References

External links
 and Baseball-Reference Black Baseball stats and Seamheads

1909 births
1974 deaths
Atlanta Black Crackers players
Morris Brown Wolverines football players
Baseball outfielders